Katharine Cullen (born 9 June 1975) is an Australian actress, daughter of actors Max Cullen and Colleen Anne Fitzpatrick.

Education
NIDA (National Institute of Dramatic Art). Bachelor of Dramatic Art.
The College of Fine Arts (COFA), University of New South Wales (BFA Hons, MFA)
The Ensemble Studios. Diploma of Acting.
The McDonald College High School of Performing Arts

Career
Cullen played a feral child in Mad Max Beyond Thunderdome directed by George Miller, Little Pam in A Girl's Own Story by Jane Campion, Frances in the internationally screened television series Hills End, and Alana, the title role in The Girl From Tomorrow and its sequel The Girl from Tomorrow Part II: Tomorrow's End, a popular sci-fi children’s television series that spawned books, newsletters, fanclubs and international awards, including nominations for three (AFI) Australian Film Institute Awards.

Katharine made her professional stage debut aged 24 at The Opera House for The Sydney Theatre Company in A Month in the Country as Vera, directed by Lindy Davies and later played Mrs Fainall, the daughter of Lady Wishfort played by Miriam Margolyes, in The Sydney Theatre Company production of The Way of the World directed by Gale Edwards. She starred in Humble Boy for the Ensemble Theatre and alongside her father, actor Max in the Ensemble Theatre production of I Ought to be in Pictures by Neil Simon, both plays directed by artistic director of the Ensemble Sandra Bates, one reviewer stating  "Cullen's portrayal as the outspoken, heartbreakingly brave young girl is magnificent. Her ability to imbue her character with a sensitive mix of fragile vulnerability overlaid by outspoken confidence is remarkable."

Cullen later worked with the Sydney Theatre Company performing Brecht and for Belvoir St Theatre as Titania in A Midsummer Night's Dream.  In 2010, Cullen appeared in Chekhov’s The Seagull for the Siren Theatre Company. "A special mention must go to Katharine Cullen’s Masha, whose unrequited passion for Konstantin brings about some of the funniest and saddest scenes... Cullen’s vodka-soaked rant inspired well deserved spontaneous applause." In late 2010, for the Ensemble Theatre Cullen played Grace in Between Us, and also for The Ensemble played Kyra in David Hare's Skylight during July 2012.

Acting credits
"Skylight" by David Hare, Ensemble Theatre 'Kyra'. Dir. Mark Kilmurry 2012
"Between Us" by Joe Hortua, Ensemble Theatre 'Grace'. Dir. Jennifer Don 2010
"The Seagull" by Anton Chekhov, Siren Theatre Company. 'Masha'. Dir. Kate Gaul 2010
"NRMA Commercial". Radical Media. Dir. Sean Kruck 2010
"A Midsummer Night’s Dream" by William Shakespeare, Belvoir St Theatre. 'Hippolyta/Titania' Dir. Eamon Flack 2009
"Summerfolk" by Maxim Gorky, Belvoir St Theatre Workshop. 'Varya'. Dir. Eamon Flack 2009
"Mother Courage/ Caucasian Chalk Circle" by Bertolt Brecht, Sydney Theatre Company. 'Kattrin/ Grusha' Dir. Lee Lewis 2009
"Dirtyland/Return to Earth". by Elise Hearst & Lally Katz, The Australian National Play Festival. 'Anya/ Jeanie'. Dirs. Susie Dee & Jon Halpin 2009
"Gallipoli". Sydney Theatre Company. Dir. Nigel Jamison 2008
"Humble Boy" by Charlotte Jones, Ensemble Theatre. 'Rosie Pye'. Dir. Sandra Bates 2004
"The Way of the World" by William Congreve, Sydney Theatre Company. 'Mrs Fainall'. Dir Gale Edwards 2003
"The Vagina Monologues" by Eve Ensler. Adrian Bohm Presents 2002
"I Ought to be in Pictures" by Neil Simon, Ensemble Theatre. Libby. Dir. Sandra Bates 2001
"Tracey McBean". Animated series for ABC Kids. 2001
"A Month in the Country" by Ivan Turgenev, Sydney Theatre Company. 'Vera'. Dir. Lindy Davies 2000
"The Adventures of Sam". Southern Star. Dir. George Whaley 1997
"The Girl from Tomorrow Part II: Tomorrow's End." Film Australia. 'Alana'. Dir. Noel Price 1991
"The Girl From Tomorrow". Film Australia. 'Alana'. Kathy Mueller 1990
"Hills End" Revcom. 'Frances'. Dir. Di Drew 1987
"Mad Max Beyond Thunderdome". Kennedy Miller. 'Feral Child'. Dir. George Miller 1984
"A Girl's Own Story". AFTRS. 'Little Pam'. Dir. Jane Campion 1984

References

External links

'A Midsummer Night's Dream' review
'Midsummer's' review
Article about 'Summerfolk' at Belvoir St
Cullen at 'NIDA'
Wicked Ways article on 'The Way of the World'

Living people
Australian television actresses
Australian stage actresses
Place of birth missing (living people)
Australian film actresses
1975 births
National Institute of Dramatic Art alumni
University of New South Wales College of Fine Arts alumni